Eugene William "Gene" Oberle (April 9, 1929 – May 24, 2010) was an American farmer and politician.

Born in Thorp, Wisconsin, Oberle served in the United States Navy from 1951 to 1955. He then owned and operated a dairy farm. He served in the Wisconsin State Assembly as a Democrat from 1971 to 1975. He then served as Register of Deeds for Clark County, Wisconsin from 1985 to 1999. He died in Eau Claire, Wisconsin.

Notes

1929 births
2010 deaths
People from Thorp, Wisconsin
County officials in Wisconsin
Democratic Party members of the Wisconsin State Assembly